Alexandra Jupiter (born 11 March 1990) is a French female former volleyball and beach volleyball player, playing as an outside hitter. She was part of the France women's national volleyball team.

She competed at the 2013 Women's European Volleyball Championship. On club level she played for Criollas de Caguas.

As a beach volleyball player she competed with Laura Longuet at the 2015 European Beach Volleyball Championships.

College 
While at USC, she won the Honda Sports Award as the best female collegiate volleyball player in 2011–12.

References

External links
 
 
 

1990 births
Living people
French women's volleyball players
Place of birth missing (living people)
French beach volleyball players
Competitors at the 2018 Mediterranean Games
Mediterranean Games silver medalists for France
Mediterranean Games medalists in volleyball
USC Trojans women's volleyball players